The Liyuan Dam is a concrete-face rock-fill dam  on the Jinsha River on the border of Yulong County and Shangri-La County, Yunnan Province, China. The dam has an associated hydroelectric power station with a 2,400 MW power station containing 4 x 600 MW generators. Construction on the river diversion for the dam began in 2008. It began to impound its reservoir in November 2014 and on December 28, 2014 the first generator was commissioned. The second generator was commissioned in July 2015.

See also 

 List of power stations in China

References

Hydroelectric power stations in Yunnan
Dams in China
Dams on the Jinsha River
Concrete-face rock-fill dams
Dams completed in 2014
2014 establishments in China
Energy infrastructure completed in 2014
Buildings and structures in Lijiang
Buildings and structures in Dêqên Tibetan Autonomous Prefecture